Go! Pop! Bang! is the debut studio album by American rapper Rye Rye. It was released on N.E.E.T. Recordings, an imprint of Interscope Records. The album was originally scheduled for release in 2009, but it has since been delayed several times, due to a pregnancy and label issues. It was eventually released on May 15, 2012, with a deluxe version available through digital music retailers. The album features several artists including M.I.A., Akon, Tyga, Robyn, and Porcelain Black. Production credits are given to M.I.A., The Neptunes, Mr. Bangladesh, and RedOne. The variety of styles brought from each producer was praised by critics.

On the Billboard Hot Dance Club Songs chart, the album's three singles charted in the top 20, with "Never Will Be Mine" and "Boom Boom" being the only ones to break the top 10. As a whole, the album peaked at six on the Top Heatseekers chart. The album also charted on the Top Rap Albums and Top Electronic Albums charts.

Background
Recording started in 2008, with mentor and label boss M.I.A. at hand. M.I.A. took a pivotal role in recording at first, helping produce and write tracks while bringing in hip hop producer Arabian Prince and dance music veteran Egyptian Lover to help record the album. Together they helped to mix tracks such as "Bang". Rye Rye's first official single was the M.I.A.-produced "Sunshine". However, Rye Rye became pregnant in 2009, postponing the release of Go! Pop! Bang!. This would set in motion a series of delays which delayed the album's release until May 2012.  Even so, Rye Rye continued to create music during this period, working with music producers Bangladesh and Pharrell. In 2011, she released her first mixtape RYEot PowRR.

Composition and lyrics
Producers on Go! Pop! Bang! include Bangladesh, The Neptunes, M.I.A. and RedOne, each adding a different style to the songs they produced for the album. "It was kind of more about getting comfortable with the album," Rye Rye explains, after taking a hiatus from the album due to a pregnancy "... I started experimenting with other grooves. I felt like I wanted to get some different sounds in. I felt like I was evolving as well, and the times were changing. The first album I did, it was around for awhile , even though nobody else had heard it, it had been around in my ears for so long." "I was just working with different people that had different sounds, and I wanted to kinda work with all of them." Rye Rye said of the plethora of sounds each producer brought to Go! Pop! Bang.

Commenting on the percussive sounds on the album, Rye Rye mentions that Pharrell Williams went for a dub sound on "Shake Twist Drop", while Bangladesh focused on 808s. The former song earned comparisons to M.I.A.'s gaana song "Bird Flu". Rye Rye recalled that working with M.I.A. allowed her "to be herself, cater to society today" and enjoy creative freedom in the studio with her topical themes. RedOne brought a Eurodance sound to the song "DNA" and added guest vocals from Porcelain Black, who is signed to his 2101 Records imprint. The song also features a death growl from that industrial pop singer. Rye Rye describes the song as her favorite on the album. She went into detail, regarding the song's meaning, saying, "It's basically saying everything I did was in my DNA. I'm a party pooper, but any time I hear music, I instantly dance. I could be outside standing on the street, in the store. That's basically what the song is saying. I don't need no Adderall, no Ritalin. It comes natural." Amelia Osowski of CMJ said "DNA" was "destined to be a club hit, or as Rye Rye puts it, 'This is a party anthem.' It's one of those songs that will endlessly loop through your mind as you stumble out of bed the next morning."

The album's ballad, "Crazy Bitch", features Akon and is one of the slowest, sparsest pieces on the album. "Depending on one's investment in dance music, it's either a nice intermission or an unwanted interruption." The Washington Post said. The song "Holla Holla", Godfrey writing for The Washington Post explains, references her long-awaited debut, while being able to compete with Nicki Minaj, Azealia Banks, and Kreayshawn, leading the female MCs in the industry.

Reviewer Gregory Heaney of AllMusic commented on the production of Go! Pop! Bang and M.I.A.'s appearance on multiple songs, saying "While her hook on the chopped-up 'Better than You,' helps to add an extra layer of brash cool to the song, the real heavy hitter on the album is Bangladesh, whose simple and direct approach on tracks like "Hotter" and "Drop" showcases the same knack for dancefloor-crushing beats that the producer has used so effectively for Lil' Wayne and Nicki Minaj."

Promotion
Promotion began in 2009 with the release of the buzz single "Bang", which received positive reviews from music critics. "Bang" was also used for the soundtrack to the 2009 film Fast & Furious and later appeared briefly in the 2010 film Step Up 3D. Rye Rye's track "Get Like This", featuring rapper Busy Signal, appeared on the soundtrack to the 2009 video game NBA Live 10. Following her pregnancy in 2009, she took a short hiatus from promoting the album. By summer 2010, Rye Rye began touring with M.I.A. across Europe, appearing at many of the large music festivals. Late 2010 saw the release of "Sunshine", the first official single off Go! Pop! Bang!. Early 2011 saw Rye Rye collaborating with Urban Outfitters and POP Beauty to create a Go! Pop! Bang!-inspired nail polish set. In addition, Rye Rye embarked on a spring promotional tour, performing in Las Vegas with Robyn on April 14, 2011. This preceded the June 2011 release of "Never Will Be Mine", Rye Rye's second single which features the Swedish singer Robyn. In Summer 2011 promotion of Rye Rye's music saw the use of "New Thing" a new track by Rye Rye used in a Prabal Gurung's fashion video and in an Adidas commercial. Rye Rye has also been affiliated with mobile phone maker HTC. In Spring 2012, Rye Rye released her third single from Go! Pop! Bang!, "Boom Boom", accompanied with a music video. The track listing for Go! Pop! Bang! was revealed via Barnes & Noble's website on April 19.

Singles
{{multiple image
| align = right
| image1 = Miadigitalnewcastle.jpg
| width1 = 150
| alt1 = 
| caption1 = 
| image2 = Robyn arvikafestivalen.JPG
| width2 = 150
| alt2 = 
| caption2 = 
| footer = Artists such as M.I.A. (left) and Robyn (right) are featured on Go! Pop! Bang!s singles
}}
Three singles were released from the album before its debut on May 15, 2012. Sunshine, featuring Rye Rye's mentor, M.I.A, was the album's lead single. Spin called "Sunshine" a tribute to Rye Rye's urban upbringing, with b-girl dance moves, double dutching, and pick-up games. The second single "Never Will Be Mine" samples "Be Mine!" a song by Swedish singer Robyn. The song charted at number 12 on Billboards Hot Dance Club Songs chart. A remix made by R3hab was included on the album, while the original was reserved for the deluxe version. "Never Will Be Mine" is a hip hop ballad that showcases a sweeter side of the Baltimore rapper, contrasting her bubbly and flamboyant nature. Robyn commented that she appreciated how Rye Rye took a sad, ballad song and interpolated it into a different style in a behind-the-scenes documentary.

The third single, "Boom Boom", samples the Vengaboys' 1999 song "Boom, Boom, Boom, Boom!!". A music video accompanying the song was directed by Georgie Greville and Geremie Jasper of Legs Media, and features arcade game graphics reminiscent of the popular video games Space Invaders and Ecco the Dolphin.

Sam Lansky of MTV's Buzzworthy complimented Rye Rye for the inclusion of the Vengaboy's song of a similar title, elevating it above her work with Robyn in "Never Will Be Mine" and the Far East Movement's "Jello". Lansky called the song "a contemporary radio confection, complete with layers of Atari blips and bloops alongside "Ay!" callouts evoking Usher's "Love in This Club." Lansky closed the critique by lauding the video game music samples, calling "Boom Boom" Rye Rye's glossiest and hippest song to date. Jeff Benjamin, a blogger for Billboard, praised how the sampling of Vengaboy, combined with the youthful delivery of her rap lyrics rescued "Boom Boom" from becoming another generic pop song. Benjamin also dubbed the song as fun and appealing, confessing that the song has the potential to convert an entirely new audience to her sound. "Boom Boom" peaked at number eight on the Hot Dance Club songs chart.

Critical reception
Go! Pop! Bang! received generally positive reviews. Steve Jones of USA Today gave the album three out of four stars, saying, "[Go! Pop! Bang! has] rapid-fire boasts flow over a stream of bass-heavy beats is guaranteed to get the feet of the most recalcitrant wallflowers moving to the dance floor," adding that once the record starts, there's no use sitting down. Despite the many guest singers and rappers on the album, USA Today noticed that Rye Rye never gives up center stage. Charley Rogulewski of AOL's The Boom Box called the album a "pop experiment", likening the production and sweet yet fast-paced vocals to Nicki Minaj's Pink Friday: Roman Reloaded and Santigold's 2008 debut album.

Sarah Godfrey of The Washington Post noted that Rye Rye "has moved away from the unadulterated Baltimore club of her early collaborations with DJ Blaqstarr, but the city still flavors her music, as on the Pharrell-produced 'Shake Twist Drop,' which sounds like the Morgan State marching band battling kids playing a clapping game on a Baltimore stoop." Jody Rosen of Rolling Stone said the exclamation points in the album's title are no joke, claiming that the "unflagging energy lifts even the least of her material." AllMusic gave Go! Pop! Bang! three and a half stars out of five, lauding Rye Rye's enthusiastic debut's mixture of hip hop swagger with irresistible dance-floor beats.

Track listingNotes  signifies an additional vocal producer
  signifies a remixer and additional producerSample credits'''
 "Boom Boom" contains elements of "Boom, Boom, Boom, Boom!!", written and performed by Vengaboys.
 "Better than You" contains a sample of the recording "Anything You Can Do", written by Irving Berlin and performed by Ethel Merman and Ray Middleton.
 "Never Will Be Mine" and its remix contain a sample of "Be Mine!" (live at The Cherrytree House), written by Robin Carlsson and Klas Åhlund, and performed by Robyn.

Personnel
Credits adapted from the liner notes of the digital deluxe edition of Go! Pop! Bang!''

 Akon – vocals 
 Steve Angello – production 
 Arabian Prince – mixing 
 Yaneley Arty – management
 Mac Attkisson – recording 
 BeatGeek – all instruments, instrument programming 
 Blaqstarr – production ; recording 
 Mike Bozzi – mastering 
 Christian Rich – production 
 Andrew Coleman – arrangement, digital editing, recording 
 Shondrae "Mr. Bangladesh" Crawford – production 
 Aaron Dahl – additional vocals recording ; mixing ; additional vocal production ; engineering ; recording 
 Egyptian Lover – production ; mixing 
 Carly Ellis – wardrobe
 Chris Galland – mixing assistance 
 Brian Gardner – mastering 
 Jesus Garnica – mix assistance 
 Geo Slam – engineering, recording 
 Geoff Gibbs – engineering 
 Dana Goldstein – photography
 Ben Gordon – A&R
 Gene Grimaldi – single mastering 
 Hervé – mixing, production 
 Ghazi Hourani – mixing assistance ; assistant engineering 
 J.O.B – engineering, production 
 Jesse Jackson – recording 
 Jimmy Joker – all instruments, instrument programming 
 Jaycen Joshua – mixing 
 Chris Kasych – recording 
 Martin "Cherry Cherry Boom Boom" Kierszenbaum – backing vocals, keyboards, production ; A&R, executive production
 Stephen Loveridge – art direction, design
 M.I.A. – production ; vocals ; mixing, recording ; A&R, executive production
 Erik Madrid – mixing assistance 
 MadV – production 
 Fabian Marascuillo – mixing 
 Manny Marroquin – mixing 
 Jaime Martinez – photography
 Rudy "Mayru" Maya – production 
 Meeno – photography
 Trevor Muzzy – engineering, guitars, recording, vocal editing 
 Ryan Origin – production 
 Robert Orton – mixing 
 The Neptunes – production 
 Play-N-Skillz – production 
 Porcelain Black – vocals 
 R3hab – additional production, remix 
 RedOne – production 
 Robyn – vocals 
 Jose "Hoza" Rodriguez – stylist
 Sinden – production 
 Teddy Sky – backing vocals, recording, vocal editing 
 Nandi Smythe – management coordination
 So Japan – production 
 Tyga – rap 
 Tony Ugval – engineering 
 Gary "Ski Live" Walker – recording 
 Halley Wollens – photography

Charts

References

2012 debut albums
Albums produced by Bangladesh (record producer)
Albums produced by Egyptian Lover
Albums produced by M.I.A. (rapper)
Albums produced by Martin Kierszenbaum
Albums produced by the Neptunes
Albums produced by RedOne
Interscope Records albums